Sergeyevo is a rural locality (a village) in Vozhbalskoye Rural Settlement, Totemsky District, Vologda Oblast, Russia. The population was 20 as of 2002.

Geography 
Sergeyevo is located 41 km west of Totma (the district's administrative centre) by road. Kudrinskaya is the nearest rural locality.

References 

Rural localities in Totemsky District